Christopher Morgan may refer to:

 Christopher Morgan (politician) (1808–1877), U.S. representative
 Christopher Morgan (Royal Navy officer) (born 1939), British Royal Navy officer
 Christopher Morgan (bishop) (born 1947), English bishop
 Christopher A. Morgan, namesake of Fort Morgan, for which Morgan County, Colorado, was named